Rock FM (callsign: 4RFM) is a Community radio station based in Moranbah, Queensland, Australia.

External links

References

Radio stations in Queensland